The 1979 Cross River State gubernatorial election occurred on July 28, 1979. NPN's Clement Isong won election for a first term to become Cross River State's first executive governor leading and, defeating main opposition in the contest.

Clement Isong emerged winner in the NPN gubernatorial primary election. His running mate was Mathias Ofoboche.

Electoral system
The Governor of Cross River State is elected using the plurality voting system.

Results
There were five political parties registered by the Federal Electoral Commission (FEDECO) to participate in the election. Clement Nyong Isong of the NPN won the contest by polling the highest votes.

References 

Cross River State gubernatorial elections
Cross River State gubernatorial election
July 1979 events in Nigeria